Chabangu is a surname. Notable people with the surname include: 

Lerato Chabangu (born 1985), South African football player
Makosini Chabangu, South African politician
Zinzi Chabangu (born 1996), South African triple jumper

Surnames of African origin